Boy Meets Dog! is an American animated musical commercial short made in 1938 for Ipana Toothpaste. It was produced by Walter Lantz as a Technicolor cartoon for theatrical release by Universal Pictures. However, it did not see theatrical release, but  Castle Films purchased it, and released it to the home movie market.

Plot
A boy named Bobby, gets a lesson in school about how to properly massage his gums to take care of his teeth. After class is dismissed, Bobby is offered by one of his friends in to an ice cream shop to have a sundae and go fishing. Bobby turns it down because his extremely strict, cold-hearted, and mean father (Billy Bletcher) wouldn't let him. On the way home, Bobby finds a beagle named Joseph and takes him home. They sneak into the house where Bobby cleans him up in order to convince his father to keep him. However, Bobby's father, who wakes up just in time to hear Joseph's barking coming from the upstairs bathroom, angrily scares Joseph away and Joseph hides in the house. He then cruelly and unfairly sends Bobby to his room without supper for disobeying him. Muttering about his son, he steps on a rollerskate and falls down the stairs. He brutally walks back upstairs to Bobby's room to punish him, but Bobby is not there and he begins looking for him. The gnomes and elves on the wallpaper in Bobby's room come alive and knock Bobby's father unconscious and take him into the forest scene in the wallpaper.

He wakes up in a stock before a judge and jury, where he learns that he is charged with being "neurotic and erratic." Joseph the beagle appears in the scene and gives a false testimony that the father "hit him, and then he kicked him." The jury finds that he "has no mentality" because he does not massage his gums, and is "childlike in his dental knowledge" despite the fact that he attended college, and so finds him guilty. The judge then reveals himself to be Bobby, and he sentences his father to the "youth machine," The father is falls through a trap door in the ground, sliding down a series of curved slides before falling through an open hatch in the youth machine. He is then battered by two boxing gloves, that disorient and position him in the center of the machine where a hydraulic press squashes him down to a shorter size. A large device spins and rises up from the floor underneath him, wrecking bowel control, widing his hips and knocking him off his feet. Upon landing a mechanical hand reaches out and pulls his nose stretching his face. He is then cuffed into a crude barber chair by his wrists and neck where his hair is shaved, a strange dollop of some kind of substance is applied to his forehead. Finally a steam press like machine comes down over him, ejecting his clothing in every direction before lifting and revealing it had successful regressed the adult into a baby. The baby cries defiantly as the machine powders his behind before placing him in a diaper wrapping him in it before pressing it to his groin and rubbing the nipple of a bottle against his mouth. Bobby's father wakes up from Joseph the beagle licking his face, explaining the sensation of the bottle being rubbed against him. His behavior changes when he sees the Ipana toothpaste sign that concludes that Bobby is smart and begins acting kinder to him. Bobby, his father, and his friends all go out for sundaes and go fishing in the river.

History
The short was originally a commercial for "Ipana Toothpaste", but the scene of the toothpaste ad after Bobby's father wakes up was removed.

Cultural impact
 The part where the three lawyer gnomes sing about how the father is a "mental giant" would later on be used in (If not inspiring) Tech N9ne's song "He's a mental Giant" in his album All 6's and 7's.
 Also, the part where gnomes sing about how the father is "child like in his dental knowledge" would later on be used in the ending of Carpenter Brut's song "Escape from Midwich Valley" in his album EP I.

See also
 List of films in the public domain in the United States

References

External links
 Boy Meets Dog at Internet Movie Database
 

1938 animated films
1938 short films
Animated films about dogs
Films about father–son relationships
Films about gnomes
Films about elves
Films directed by Walter Lantz
Universal Pictures short films
Universal Pictures animated short films
1930s English-language films
American animated short films
Films about single parent families
1930s American films